Staroměstská is a Prague Metro station on Line A. It was opened on 12 August 1978 as part of the inaugural section of Line A, between Leninova and Náměstí Míru.

General information
The station is located under Kaprova street in the Old Town (its name means 'Old Town' [station]). There is currently one entrance through an escalator tunnel from the corner of Kaprova and Valentinská streets (with the Old Jewish Cemetery, Municipal Library and Rudolfinum within one or two minutes walk). There were also plans to build a second escalator tunnel with an entrance from the northeast corner of the Old Town Square which would use and show to the public a preserved cellar of a medieval house (like the ruins of a medieval bridge at Můstek station), but this has been postponed indefinitely due to financial constraints.

The architect of this station is Lubomír Hanel. The design is characteristic of the A line, with the ceiling and the walls tiled using anodized aluminum panels, and the pillars tiled with white marble.

Gallery

References

Prague Metro stations
Railway stations opened in 1978
1978 establishments in Czechoslovakia
Railway stations in the Czech Republic opened in the 20th century